Xiamen Island, alternately known as Amoy Island from its Hokkien pronunciation, is an island in southeastern Fujian, China, on the Taiwan Strait. It is administered by the People's Republic of China as the Huli and Siming urban districts of the sub-provincial city of Xiamen. The Gaoji Causeway is to the North, the old Yundang Harbor (now an inclosed lake), is to the West. The Kinmen Islands, controlled by the Republic of China, are to the South East. With a population of 1,847,047 people, it forms the core of the city's special economic zone.

See also

 List of islands of China
 Xiamen

References

Islands of Fujian
Taiwan Strait
Populated places in Fujian
Islands of China